Gullage's was a Canadian television comedy-drama series, which aired on CBC Television from 1996 to 1997. The show starred Bryan Hennessey as Calvin Pope, a cab driver for Gullage's Taxi in St. John's, Newfoundland and Labrador.

The cast also included Brenda Devine, Brian Best, Elizabeth Pickard, Frank Barry, Janis Spence, Jody Richardson, Koady Whelan, Mercedes Barry, Michael Wade and Philip Dinn.

The show aired six episodes in its first season, and was renewed for a 13-episode second season which aired in 1997. It concluded its run in December 1997, and was not renewed for a third season.

References

External links
 

CBC Television original programming
1996 Canadian television series debuts
1997 Canadian television series endings
Television shows set in Newfoundland and Labrador
Fictional taxi drivers
Television shows filmed in St. John's, Newfoundland and Labrador
1990s Canadian comedy-drama television series